Danish Asiatic Company (Danish: Asiatisk Kompagni) was a Danish trading company established in 1730 to revive Danish trade on the Danish East Indies and China following the closure of the Danish East India Company. It was granted a 40-year monopoly on Danish trade on Asia in 1732 and taken over by the Danish government in 1772. It was headquartered at Asiatisk Plads in Copenhagen. Its former premises are now used by the Ministry of Foreign Affairs.

Management

Presidents
 1750–1771: Adam Gottlob Moltke

Board of directors
Members  of the board of directors included:
 1730–1739: Gregorius Klauman
 1736–1746: Michael Fabritius
 1739–1752: Olfert Fas Fischer
 1743–1752: Joost van Hemert
 1745–1754: Peter van Hurk
 1769–1772: Gysbert Behagen
 1770–1775: John Brown
 1772–1775: Niels Ryberg
 1772–1784: Conrad Fabritius de Tengnagel
 1773–1775: William Halling
 1773–1775: Peder Hoppe
 1776–1783: Peter van Hemert
 1779–1784: Niels Ryberg
 1779-1785: John Brown
 1783-1792: Erich Erichsen
 1791-1805: Johan Leonhard Fix
  1792–1811: Carsten Anker, 1st director
 1812–1819: Christian Klingberg
 1816–1823: Conrad Hauser
 1819–1843: Friederich Christian Schäffer
 1837–1843: William Frederik Duntzfelt
Years unknown: Simon Hooglant
 Unknown years: Hermann Abbestée
 Unknown Years: René Pierre François Mourier
 Rasmus Sternberg Selmer

Fleet
Details of some of these armed trading ships, often built by the Royal Danish dockyards as "handelskib, chinafarer", can be found at the Royal Danish Naval Museum website Two have a history record at Skibregister.

Cron Printz Christian
 Slesvig**
 Kongen af Danmark (built 1735)
 Dronningen af Danmark (built 1738)
 Prinsesse Lowisa (acquired 1738)
 Prinsesse Charlotte Amalie (acquired 1738)
 Cronprins (built 1740)
 Christiansborg Slot (built 1742)
 Trankebar (built 1744)
 Dokkwen (bought 1742)
 Lowisa (acquired 1744)
 Fyen (acquired 1745, former ship-of-the-line)
 Kronprinsessen af Danmark (built 1745)
 Kongen af Danmark (built 1745)
 Elephanten (acquired 1746, from Rotterdam)
 Kronprinsen af Danmark (built 1746)
 Dronningen af Danmark (built 1747) – renamed Dronning Sophie Magdalene i 1752
 Prinsesse Wilhelmine Caroline (built 1750)
 Dronning Juliane Marie (built 1752)
 Kongen af Danmark (built 1755)
 Dronning Sophie Magdalene (built 1761–62)
 Fredensborg Slot (built 1764–65)
 Rigernes Ønske (built 1766)
 Kongen af Danmark (built 1768–69)
 Bombardergalliot "Den Gloende" (built 1771)
 Prins Frederik (built 1772)
 Trankebar (built 1773)
 Dronning Juliane Marie (built 1775)
 Kronprinsen af Danmark (built 1778)
 Prinsesse Sophia Frederica (built 1779)
 Dronning Juliane Marie (built 1780)
 Prinsesse Charlotte Amalie (built 1781)
 Nicobar (built about 1781)
 Danmark (bygget 1782–83)
 Prinsesse Lowisa Magdalena (built about 1782)
 Nicobar (build year unknown) (NB two ships called Nicobar. Are they the same?)
 Mars (built 1784)
 Dannebrog (rebuilt 1786)
 Kongen af Danmark (built 1788)
 Arveprinsen af Augustenborg  (built 1789)
 Norge (rebuilt 1797–98)
 Christianshavn (acquired 1800)
 Holsteen (acquired 1800)
 Kronprinsen af Danmark (acquired 1801)
 Arveprinsen af Augustenborg (major repairs 1805)
 Kanonchalup (built 1808)

References

Citations
 Knud Klem: Skibsbyggeriet i Danmark og Hertugdømmerne i 1700-årene''; Bind I, København 1985; 
Knud Klem: "Den danske Ostindie- og Kinahandel" (Handels- og Søfartsmuseets Årbog 1943; s. 72-102)
Royal Danish Naval Museum website for Database > Avancerede > Set Skibstype to "Handelsskib" and Datering to appropriate dates> Søg (This works only if the language is set to Danish)
Royal Danish Naval Museum - List of Danish Warships
Royal Danish Naval Museum - Skibregister for individual ships record cards where they exist.

External links

At the Altar of Capitalism  – Calvinist merchants in the Danish Asiatic Company in the 18th century
The list of ships has been roughly copied from the Danish wikipedia article :da:Asiatisk Kompagni where inline references can be found
 Ships
 DAC ships
 Source

Danish Asiatic Company
Defunct companies of Denmark
Danish companies established in 1730
Companies based in Copenhagen
1845 disestablishments in Denmark